Edinaldo is a Portuguese masculine given name, derived from a Germanic cognate of the Old English name Edwald, that may refer to the following notable people:

Edinaldo Malcher de França Filho (born 1988), Brazilian footballer
Grafite, nickname of Edinaldo Batista Libânio (born 1979), Brazilian footballer
Edinaldo Batista dos Santos (born 1987), Brazilian midfielder also known as simply Edinaldo
Edinaldo Filgueira, (ca. 1975 – 2011), Brazilian blogger and journalist, editor
Naldo (footballer, born 1988), nickname of Edinaldo Gomes Pereira (born 1988), Brazilian professional footballer

See also

Ednaldo da Conceição, also known as Naldo